Ravichandran is an Indian cinematographer, predominantly works in Malayalam films.

Career 
He started his career as assistant cinematographer in various Malayalam films and later he made his debut as an independent cinematographer through the film Kaanchi. His notable works includes Life of Josutty, Pattabhiraman etc.

Filmography

References

External links 

 

Living people
Malayalam film cinematographers
Year of birth missing (living people)